Bradley Gray Maynard (born May 9, 1979) is an American mixed martial artist who competed in the Featherweight division of the Ultimate Fighting Championship (UFC). Between 2008 and 2011, he competed in a noted rivalry with former UFC Lightweight Champion Frankie Edgar. Maynard competed in college wrestling at Michigan State University, and made his UFC debut in 2007.

Background
Maynard's father, Jan, was a two-time Ohio high school state wrestling champion. He also has a sister named Misty. Maynard attended Bonanza High School and Durango High School (Las Vegas), and transferred to St. Edward High School, Lakewood, Ohio, for two years, where he wrestled for coach Greg Urbas, and excelled in its wrestling program.

In 1997, he placed second in the Ohio High School Athletic Association (OHSAA) state tournament in the 140 lb weight class for Division I. In 1998, he was the state champion at the 152 lb weight class.  His high school record was an impressive 135–16, including being undefeated in his sophomore and senior years. His nickname of "Bully" came from his dog, Hank, a bull terrier he rescued. Maynard wrestled alongside former UFC light heavyweight champion Rashad Evans at Michigan State University. They were also roommates. He was redshirted in his freshman year. In 2001, he placed eighth at the NCAA Division I Collegiate Wrestling Championship at 157 lb weight class. In 2002 and 2003, he placed seventh. The performance earned the MSU co-captain All-American honors for the third time in his collegiate career.

Upon graduation, Maynard ranked 11th all-time in MSU history with 106 career wins and seventh with 26 falls. After not making the 2004 US Olympic wrestling team, Maynard considered retirement from the sport. He was then recruited to be a sparring partner for mixed martial arts fighter and former Lightweight UFC champion B.J. Penn. With his exposure to the new sport, Maynard sought to compete in it. With his wrestling connections, he eventually became a student and training partner of UFC Hall of Famer Randy Couture.

Mixed martial arts career

The Ultimate Fighter
Maynard was a contestant on The Ultimate Fighter 5, which featured Lightweights exclusively. He was selected by B.J. Penn to be on his team and was Penn's pick to make it to the finals.

Maynard beat Wayne Weems in the preliminary round. In the quarterfinals, Maynard faced Brandon Melendez in a tough matchup and won the fight with a guillotine choke in the second round. He lost his semifinal matchup in the second round against Nate Diaz due to guillotine choke.

As part of The Ultimate Fighter 5 Finale preliminary Card on June 23, 2007, Maynard fought Rob Emerson in a controversial Lightweight fight. Maynard seemed to be in control of the fight in round one. During the second round he picked up Emerson and slammed him to the mat. Emerson immediately tapped out because of an injury to his ribs. The referee believed that Maynard also could not continue because he seemed to have hit his head on the mat and knocked himself out due to the force of his own slam. Since both fighters could not continue he ruled it a "No Contest". UFC President Dana White commented, "I know one thing, that Maynard was out cold". Maynard did not agree, and cited the cage-side doctors, who, after testing Maynard, found he had suffered no concussion during the bout.

Ultimate Fighting Championship
In his next fight he took on Joe Veres at UFC Fight Night 11 and knocked him out with the first punch he threw, after nine seconds. It was the second fastest knockout in UFC history (at that time, see UFC 102). Next Maynard won a unanimous decision victory over Dennis Siver at UFC Fight Night 12 earning scores of (29–28, 30–27, and 29–28). At UFC Fight Night 13, he faced lightweight standout Frankie Edgar in the first bout of their rivalry. Maynard won a 30–27 unanimous decision on all cards to hand Edgar his first loss. He used his superior wrestling to control the fight, winning a decision.

Maynard also worked as an assistant wrestling coach for Forrest Griffin as part of The Ultimate Fighter: Team Rampage vs. Team Forrest.

Maynard earned a unanimous decision over Rich Clementi at UFC 90. In his fight, Maynard once again showed his superior wrestling as he controlled Clementi on the ground for 3 rounds. He did however appear notably disappointed during his post fight interview that he was unable to finish the fight.

Maynard then fought at UFC 96, against lightweight Jim Miller, winning by unanimous decision once again, with all three judges scoring the bout 30–27. Maynard kept the fight on the feet inversing his wrestling skills with excellent takedown defense and displayed solid standup skills, particularly looping bodyshot combos.

Maynard won against Roger Huerta via split decision at UFC Fight Night 19. During the fight, he had Huerta in a visibly deep kimura, though his opponent refused to submit.

Maynard defeated TUF 5 lightweight champion Nate Diaz via split decision at UFC Fight Night 20.

Maynard defeated Kenny Florian on August 28, 2010 at UFC 118 via unanimous decision (30–27, 30–27, and 29–28). Maynard took Florian down at will and controlled him on the mat, thus becoming the #1 contender for the UFC Lightweight Championship.

In a Fight of the Night winning contest, Maynard and the champion Frankie Edgar fought to a split draw on January 1, 2011 at UFC 125, resulting in Edgar retaining his belt. Early reports were that the former WEC champion Anthony Pettis would receive the next title shot, but Dana White later announced that instead Edgar vs Maynard 3 would be the next lightweight title fight at UFC 130.  On May 9, it was announced that injuries to both forced the fight to be removed from the card. Many consider the second fight with Edgar as one of the greatest fights in UFC history.
 
The third bout between Edgar and Maynard took place on October 8, 2011 as the main event of UFC 136. Maynard was defeated by Edgar via KO at 3:54 of round 4, resulting in the first official loss of his career. After a first round similar to the first round in their bout at UFC 125, Edgar was able to close in on Maynard landing more shots and becoming the aggressor. He finished Maynard with a flurry of punches, starting with an uppercut that rocked Maynard.

On November 21, 2011 Maynard's Head boxing coach Gil Martinez told The MMA Show, that Maynard would be leaving Xtreme Couture gym for American Kickboxing Academy.

Maynard fought Clay Guida at UFC on FX 4. He won the bout via split decision.

Maynard was expected to face Joe Lauzon on December 29, 2012 at UFC 155.  However, Maynard pulled out of the bout citing a knee injury and was replaced by Jim Miller.

Maynard next faced T. J. Grant at UFC 160 on May 25, 2013. Dana White announced at the UFC on Fox 7 post-fight press conference that he expects that the winner of the Maynard/Grant fight to get a UFC Lightweight title shot against Benson Henderson. Maynard lost the fight via TKO in the first round.

A rubber match with Nate Diaz took place on November 30, 2013 at The Ultimate Fighter 18 Finale. Maynard lost via TKO in the first round.

Maynard was expected to face Fabrício Camões on August 2, 2014 at UFC 176.  However, after UFC 176 was cancelled, Maynard/Camões was rescheduled and expected to take place on August 16, 2014 at UFC Fight Night 47. In turn, Maynard stepped up as an injury replacement for Abel Trujillo after he pulled out of a bout with Ross Pearson. He lost the fight against Pearson by TKO in the second round.

After the loss to Pearson, signed a new, eight-fight contract and moved back to Las Vegas to train at Xtreme Couture.

Maynard faced Alexander Yakovlev on April 4, 2015 at UFC Fight Night 63. He lost the fight by unanimous decision.

Maynard faced Fernando Bruno in a featherweight bout on July 8, 2016 at The Ultimate Fighter 23 Finale. He won the bout via unanimous decision.

Maynard faced Ryan Hall on December 3, 2016 at The Ultimate Fighter 24 Finale. He lost the fight via unanimous decision.

Maynard faced Teruto Ishihara on July 7, 2017 at The Ultimate Fighter 25 Finale. He won the fight by unanimous decision.

Maynard returned to lightweight against Nik Lentz on October 6, 2018 at UFC 229. He lost the fight via TKO in the second round after being dropped by a head kick and finished with punches. A year later, Maynard revealed that he had parted ways with the UFC after a tenure which lasted over a decade, covering almost his whole professional mixed martial arts career.

Personal life
Maynard and his longtime girlfriend are currently engaged. Maynard has a daughter, Estella (born 2013).

Gray Maynard co-starred in the movie, Art of Submission  with Ving Rhames and Ernie Reyes, Jr.

Maynard appeared on the "Schumacher Family" episode of Supernanny teaching the family's seven-year-old son about MMA at Randy Couture's gym. Maynard also was an Assistant Coach alongside Forrest Griffin and Tyson Griffin with head coach Rich Franklin on the last episode of the 11th season of The Ultimate Fighter.

Championships and accomplishments

Mixed martial arts
Ultimate Fighting Championship
The Ultimate Fighter 5 Lightweight Tournament Semifinalist
Fight of the Night (Three times)
Performance of the Night (One time)
World MMA Awards
2011 Fight of the Year vs. Frankie Edgar at UFC 125
Sherdog
Fight of the Year (2011) vs. Frankie Edgar on January 1

Collegiate wrestling
National Collegiate Athletic Association
NCAA Division I 157 lb - 8th place out of Michigan State University (2001)
NCAA Division I 157 lb - 7th place out of Michigan State University (2002)
NCAA Division I 157 lb - 7th place out of Michigan State University (2003)
 NCAA Division I All-American (2001, 2002, 2003)

Mixed martial arts record 

|-
|Loss
|align=center|13–7–1 (1)
|Nik Lentz
|TKO (head kick and punches)
|UFC 229 
|
|align=center|2
|align=center|1:19
|Las Vegas, Nevada, United States
|
|-
|Win
|align=center| 13–6–1 (1)
|Teruto Ishihara
|Decision (unanimous)
|The Ultimate Fighter: Redemption Finale 
|
|align=center|3
|align=center|5:00
|Las Vegas, Nevada, United States
|
|-
|Loss
|align=center| 12–6–1 (1)
| Ryan Hall
|Decision (unanimous)
|The Ultimate Fighter: Tournament of Champions Finale 
|
|align=center| 3
|align=center| 5:00
|Las Vegas, Nevada, United States
|
|-
|Win
|align=center| 12–5–1 (1)
|Fernando Bruno
|Decision (unanimous)
|The Ultimate Fighter: Team Joanna vs. Team Cláudia Finale
|
|align=center|3
|align=center|5:00
|Las Vegas, Nevada, United States
|
|-
|Loss
|align=center| 11–5–1 (1)
| Alexander Yakovlev
|Decision (unanimous)
|UFC Fight Night: Mendes vs. Lamas
|
|align=center|3
|align=center|5:00
|Fairfax, Virginia, United States
|
|-
|Loss
|align=center| 11–4–1 (1)
| Ross Pearson
| TKO (punches)
|UFC Fight Night: Bader vs. St. Preux
|
|align=center| 2
|align=center| 1:35
|Bangor, Maine, United States
|
|-
|Loss
|align=center| 11–3–1 (1)
| Nate Diaz
| TKO (punches)
|The Ultimate Fighter: Team Rousey vs. Team Tate Finale
|
|align=center| 1
|align=center| 2:38
|Las Vegas, Nevada, United States
|
|-
|Loss
|align=center| 11–2–1 (1)
| T. J. Grant
| TKO (knee and punches)
|UFC 160
|
|align=center| 1
|align=center| 2:07
|Las Vegas, Nevada, United States
| 
|-
|Win
|align=center| 11–1–1 (1)
| Clay Guida
| Decision (split)
|UFC on FX: Maynard vs. Guida
|
|align=center| 5
|align=center| 5:00
|Atlantic City, New Jersey, United States
| 
|-
|Loss
|align=center| 10–1–1 (1)
| Frankie Edgar
| KO (punches)
| UFC 136
| 
|align=center| 4
|align=center| 3:54
| Houston, Texas, United States
| 
|-
| Draw
|align=center|  (1)
| Frankie Edgar
| Draw (split)
| UFC 125
| 
|align=center| 5
|align=center| 5:00
|Las Vegas, Nevada, United States
| 
|-
| Win
|align=center| 10–0 (1)
| Kenny Florian
| Decision (unanimous)
| UFC 118
| 
|align=center| 3
|align=center| 5:00
|Boston, Massachusetts, United States
| 
|-
| Win
|align=center| 9–0 (1)
| Nate Diaz
| Decision (split)
| UFC Fight Night: Maynard vs. Diaz
| 
|align=center| 3
|align=center| 5:00
|Fairfax, Virginia, United States
| 
|-
| Win
|align=center| 8–0 (1)
|  Roger Huerta
| Decision (split)
| UFC Fight Night: Diaz vs. Guillard
| 
|align=center| 3
|align=center| 5:00
|Oklahoma City, Oklahoma, United States
| 
|-
| Win
|align=center| 7–0 (1)
| Jim Miller
| Decision (unanimous)
| UFC 96
| 
|align=center| 3
|align=center| 5:00
|Columbus, Ohio, United States
| 
|-
| Win
|align=center| 6–0 (1)
|  Rich Clementi
| Decision (unanimous)
| UFC 90
| 
|align=center| 3
|align=center| 5:00
|Rosemont, Illinois, United States
| 
|-
| Win
|align=center| 5–0 (1)
|  Frankie Edgar
| Decision (unanimous)
| UFC Fight Night: Florian vs. Lauzon
| 
|align=center| 3
|align=center| 5:00
|Broomfield, Colorado, United States
| 
|-
| Win
|align=center| 4–0 (1)
| Dennis Siver
| Decision (unanimous)
| UFC Fight Night: Swick vs. Burkman
| 
|align=center| 3
|align=center| 5:00
|Las Vegas, Nevada, United States
|
|-
| Win
|align=center| 3–0 (1)
| Joe Veres
| KO (punch)
| UFC Fight Night: Thomas vs. Florian
| 
|align=center| 1
|align=center| 0:09
|Las Vegas, Nevada, United States
| 
|-
|  NC
|align=center| 2–0 (1)
| Rob Emerson
| NC (double KO due to slam)
| The Ultimate Fighter 5 Finale
| 
|align=center| 2
|align=center| 2:39
|Las Vegas, Nevada, United States
| 
|-
| Win
|align=center| 2–0
| Brent Weedman
| Decision (unanimous)
| WEF: Orleans Arena
| 
|align=center| 3
|align=center| 5:00
|Las Vegas, Nevada, United States
| 
|-
| Win
|align=center| 1–0
| Joshua Powell
| TKO (punches)
| Title Fighting Championships 1
| 
|align=center| 1
|align=center| 2:56
|Des Moines, Iowa, United States
|

The Ultimate Fighter 5 

| Loss
|align=center| 2–1
| Nate Diaz
| Submission (guillotine choke)
| The Ultimate Fighter 5
| 
|align=center| 2
|align=center| 1:17
| Las Vegas, Nevada, United States
| 
|-
| Win
|align=center| 2–0
| Brandon Melendez
| Submission (guillotine choke)
| The Ultimate Fighter 5
| 
|align=center| 2
|align=center| 4:07
| Las Vegas, Nevada, United States
| 
|-
| Win
|align=center| 1–0
| Wayne Weems
| TKO (punches)
| The Ultimate Fighter 5
| 
|align=center| 1
|align=center| 2:47
| Las Vegas, Nevada, United States
|

Amateur mixed martial arts record

| Win
|align=center| 1–0
| Evan Dunham
| Decision (Unanimous)
| SF (SportFight) 15
| 8 April 2006
|align=center| 3
|align=center| 3:00
| Oregon, United States
|

Pay-per-view bouts

See also
 List of current UFC fighters
 List of male mixed martial artists

References

External links 
Official UFC Profile
 Official Site of Gray Maynard
 The Ultimate Fighter 5 Bio
 
 Gray Maynard profile at the National Wrestling Hall of Fame

American male mixed martial artists
Mixed martial artists from Nevada
Mixed martial artists from Ohio
Lightweight mixed martial artists
Mixed martial artists utilizing collegiate wrestling
Mixed martial artists utilizing Brazilian jiu-jitsu
Living people
1979 births
St. Edward High School (Lakewood, Ohio) alumni
American male sport wrestlers
Ultimate Fighting Championship male fighters
American practitioners of Brazilian jiu-jitsu